Antonia Jane Jones (1943 – 2010) was a British mathematician and computer scientist. Her research considered number theory and computer science.

Early life and education 
Jones was born in 1943 in Queen Charlotte's and Chelsea Hospital. She was the first member of her family to attend university. Jones contracted polio as a child and lost both of her legs at the age of ten. Jones attended the University of Reading, where she studied mathematics and physics and graduated both with first class honours. She was a doctoral student in number theory at the University of Cambridge, where she completed her PhD in 1969. Jones joined the University of Nottingham after earning her doctorate, before joining Imperial College London as a Senior Lecturer. She spent a year at the Institute for Advanced Study, after which she joined the faculty at the University of Colorado Boulder.

Research and career 
Jones returned to the United Kingdom in the 1970s, where she became a lecturer at Royal Holloway, University of London. Her interest switched from mathematics to computing and she started to explore acoustic pattern recognition. Whilst Jones struggled with the early computers, when technology became more accessible for people with physical disabilities she launched her own firm creating random access video controllers.

In 1983 Jones joined Brunel University London at a lecturer in Information Technology. Jones later served as Professor of Evolutionary and Neural Computing at Cardiff University. She exposed various security loopholes in banking infrastructure, including identifying significant potential fraud at HSBC.

Alongside her scientific research, Jones was involved with science communication and public engagement. She served as an electronic data consultant on the 1986 film Rocinante. She contributed to the 1998 British Science Association Festival of Science. In 2007, Jones retired from Cardiff University.

Selected publications

Personal life 
Antonia Jones spent many years with her partner Barbara Quinn at their shared farmhouse in the Brecon Beacons. Upon her retirement in 2007, Jones moved to St. Augustine, Florida.  Jones died on 23 December 2010. She is survived by Quinn and her sister Jenny Carrl.

References 

British mathematicians
1943 births
2010 deaths
Academics of Cardiff University
Alumni of the University of Reading
Number theorists
British LGBT scientists
21st-century LGBT people